The 2003 1. divisjon season kicked off on 14 April 2003, and the final round was played on 1 November 2003. 

Ham-Kam were promoted to the 2004 Tippeligaen as 1. divisjon winners, along with Fredrikstad who finished second. Ham-Kam will be playing in the top division for the first time since 1995, while Fredrikstad returned for the first time since 1975.

As in previous seasons, there was a two-legged promotion play-off at the end of the season, between the third-placed team in the 1. divisjon (Sandefjord) and the twelfth-placed team in the Tippeligaen (Vålerenga). Vålerenga kept their spot in the Tippeligaen, beating Sandefjord 5-3 on aggregate.

League table

Top goalscorers
19 goals:
Markus Ringberg, HamKam

17 goals:
Christian Johnsen, Raufoss

15 goals:
Haraldur Ingólfsson, Raufoss

13 goals:
Ben Wright, Start
Geir Televik, Hødd
Tom Helge Jacobsen, Sandefjord

Norwegian First Division seasons
2
Norway
Norway